The Buttonwood Agreement is the founding document of what is now New York Stock Exchange and is one of the most important financial documents in U.S. history. The agreement organized securities trading in New York City and was signed on May 17, 1792 between 24 stockbrokers outside of 68 Wall Street. According to legend the signing took place under a buttonwood tree where their earliest transactions had occurred.  The New York Stock Exchange celebrates the signing of this agreement on May 17, 1792 as its founding.

History
In March 1792, twenty-four of New York's leading merchants met secretly at Corre's Hotel to discuss ways to bring order to the securities business. Two months later, on May 17, 1792, these men signed a document called the Buttonwood Agreement, named after their traditional meeting place under a buttonwood tree – not because it was signed there.

There were too many brokers involved to meet under a tree. Business was conducted in various offices and coffee houses. In 1793, they coordinated their business inside the Tontine Coffee House on the corner of Wall and Water streets.

The document is now part of the archival collection of the New York Stock Exchange.

Document agreement
In brief, the agreement had two provisions: 1) the brokers were to deal only with each other, thereby eliminating the auctioneers, and 2) the commissions were to be 0.25%. It reads as follows:

Signers
The twenty-four brokers, known as Founding and Subsequent Fathers, who signed the Buttonwood Agreement were (including business location):

 Peter Anspach … 3 Great Dock Street
 Armstrong & Barnewall … 58 Broad Street
 Andrew D. Barclay … 136 Pearl Street
 Samuel Beebe … 21 Nassau Street
 G. N. Bleecker … 21 Broad Street
 Leonard Bleecker … 16 Wall Street
 John Bush … 195 Water Street
 John Ferrers … 205 Water Street
 Isaac M. Gomez … 32 Maiden Lane
 Bernard Hart … 55 Broad Street
 John A. Hardenbrook … 24 Nassau Street
 Ephraim Hart … 74 Broadway
 John Henry … 13 Duke Street
 Augustine H. Lawrence … 132 Water Street
 Samuel March … 243 Queen Street
 Charles McEvers Jr. … 194 Water Street
 Julian McEvers … 140 Greenwich Street
 David Reedy … 58 Wall Street
 Robinson & Hartshorne … 198 Queen Street
 Benjamin Seixas … 8 Hanover Square
 Hugh Smith … Tontine Coffee House
 Sutton & Hardy … 20 Wall Street
 Benjamin Winthrop … 2 Great Dock Street
 Alexander Zuntz … 97 Broad Street

References

External links
 Image of agreement at the Virtual Museum and Archive of the History of Financial Regulation of The Securities and Exchange Commission Historical Society
 Video of agreement as part of story on the CNBC cable network.

18th century in New York City
1792 in New York (state)
New York Stock Exchange
Wall Street
1792 in economics
History of stock exchanges in the United States
Individual trees in New York City
1860s individual tree deaths